Tiquilia nesiotica, known as gray matplant, is a species of plant in the family Boraginaceae. It is endemic to the Galápagos Islands.

References

Endemic flora of Galápagos
nesiotica
Vulnerable plants
Taxonomy articles created by Polbot